Sovereign Maersk is container ship, which is part of the fleet of Maersk Line. The container vessel is operated by AP Moller Maersk Denmark and built in 1997 in the shipyard of Odense Steel Shipyard.

Design
The Sovereign Maersk was built in 1997 in Odense Steel Shipyard and when built was the largest container ship in the world. The draft of the cargo ship, when is fully loaded can reach . The container vessel has deadweight of 104,690 metric tons, gross tonnage of 91,560, and capacity of 8,160 TEUs.

References

External links

Container ships
Merchant ships of Denmark
1997 ships
Ships built in Odense
Ships of the Maersk Line